Mandy Mangru (born 22 September 1999) is a Guyanese cricketer who plays for the Guyana women's national cricket team in the Women's Super50 Cup and the Twenty20 Blaze tournaments. In April 2021, Mangru was named in Cricket West Indies' high-performance training camp in Antigua. In June 2021, Mangru was named in the West Indies A Team for their series against Pakistan.

In January 2022, Mangru was named in the West Indies' Women's One Day International (WODI) squad for their series against South Africa. She made her WODI debut on 6 February 2022, for the West Indies against South Africa. Later the same month, she was named as one of three reserve players in the West Indies team for the 2022 Women's Cricket World Cup in New Zealand. Ahead of the World Cup semi-final match against Australia, Mangru was named as a replacement for Afy Fletcher, after Fletcher tested positive for COVID-19.

References

External links
 

1999 births
Living people
Guyanese women cricketers
West Indies women One Day International cricketers
Place of birth missing (living people)
Barbados Royals (WCPL) cricketers
Guyanese people of Indian descent